The Skin House is a cosmetics company founded in 1979. It is located at Seoul, South Korea.

History
The Skin House cosmetics company was founded in Seoul, South Korea in 1979. In April 2011, Han Sunhwa of Secret was chosen as the new model for The Skin House. A representative of the brand commented, “The Skin House uses natural and organic ingredients and is one of the top brands in the nation for those with sensitive skin. With Secret’s Sunhwa at our forefront, we’ll be making sure that everyone can have healthy, youthful skin with our natural products.”

References

External links
(Korean) About The Skin House at The Skin House website
 (The Skin House Thailand)  The SKIN HOUSE Thailand website http://theskinhouseth.com
 (The Skin House Vietnam)  The SKIN HOUSE Vietnam website http://skinhouse.com.vn

Cosmetics companies of South Korea
South Korean companies established in 1979
Chemical companies established in 1979